The Circuit des Frontières was a one-day road cycling race held annually in Belgium from 1964 until 1995.

Winners

References 

Cycle races in Belgium
Recurring sporting events established in 1964
Recurring sporting events disestablished in 1995
1964 establishments in Belgium
1995 disestablishments in Belgium
Defunct cycling races in Belgium